Juglans mollis, the Mexican walnut, is a species of walnut in the family Juglandaceae, native to Mexico. It was first described by Georg Engelmann.

References 

mollis
Trees of Mexico
Flora of the Sierra Madre Oriental
Endemic flora of Mexico